The 2004–05 All-Ireland Intermediate Club Hurling Championship was the inaugural staging of the All-Ireland Intermediate Club Hurling Championship since its establishment by the Gaelic Athletic Association. The championship ran from 31 October 2004 to 28 March 2005.

The All-Ireland final was played on 28 March 2005 at Semple Stadium in Thurles, between Kiladangan from Tipperary and Carrickshock from Kilkenny, in what was their first ever meeting in the final. Kiladangan won the match by 2-13 to 1-13 to claim their first All-Ireland title.

Kiladangan's Darragh Egan was the championship's top scorer with 2-29.

Connacht Intermediate Club Hurling Championship

Connacht final

Leinster Intermediate Club Hurling Championship

Leinster final

Munster Intermediate Club Hurling Championship

Munster quarter-final

Munster semi-finals

Munster final

Ulster Intermediate Club Hurling Championship

Ulster final

All-Ireland Intermediate Club Hurling Championship

All-Ireland quarter-final

All-Ireland semi-finals

All-Ireland final

Championship statistics

Top scorers

References

All-Ireland Intermediate Club Hurling Championship
All-Ireland Intermediate Club Hurling Championship
All-Ireland Intermediate Club Hurling Championship